Joseph Huang Bingzhang (born 1967) is a Chinese Roman Catholic Bishop of Shantou, Guangdong. He is now the vice-president of Chinese Patriotic Catholic Association. He was a deputy to the 11th and 13th National People's Congress.

Biography
Huang was born in Huilai County, Guangdong, in 1967.  He was ordained a priest in 1991. On July 14, 2011, he became the Bishop of Shantou, Guangdong, without papal permission and was excommunicated latae sententiae. In December 2016, he was elected vice-president of Chinese Patriotic Catholic Association.

On September 22, 2018, Pope Francis lifted the excommunication of Joseph Huang Bingzhang and other bishops previously appointed by the Chinese government without a pontifical mandate.

References

1967 births
People from Jieyang
Living people
21st-century Roman Catholic bishops in China
Delegates to the 11th National People's Congress
People temporarily excommunicated by the Catholic Church
Bishops of the Catholic Patriotic Association